David Garrett is an American filmmaker best known for directing and producing the feature-length documentary film Who Is Alvin Greene? following South Carolina's unlikely Democratic nominee for the U.S. Senate Alvin Greene on the 2010 campaign trail. The film is co-directed and co-produced by Leslie Beaumont. Garrett also co-wrote the 2005 comedy film Deuce Bigalow: European Gigolo and the 2001 comedy Corky Romano

David famously inked a one-year development deal with Fox Television in the early days of the internet when iFilm aired his short film Sunday's Game.

References

External links 

Living people
American film directors
Year of birth missing (living people)
Place of birth missing (living people)
American male screenwriters
American film producers